Emanuel Djibril Dankawa is a Nigerien football player. He plays for the Niger national football team. He can play all defensive and midfield positions.

Dankawa played for the Niger side that finished runners-up in the 2009 UEMOA Tournament., making his FIFA competitive debut for Niger on 31 May 2008 against Uganda in Kampala.

References

External links

Nigerien footballers
Year of birth missing (living people)
Living people
Association football defenders
Niger international footballers